Presunto culpable is a Spanish mystery thriller television series starring Miguel Ángel Muñoz. Produced by Atresmedia Televisión in collaboration with Boomerang TV, it aired on Antena 3 in 2018.

Premise 
Mainly set in the Basque Country, the plot concerns the investigation on the disappearance and murder of the biologist Anne Otxoa (Alejandra Onieva), after which her boyfriend, working colleague and prime suspect Jon (Miguel Ángel Muñoz) flees from his hometown of Mundaka, settling in Paris. About 5 years after the murder, Jon returns to the town to put all the pieces together and find out the truth about what happened.

Cast

Production and release 

Produced by Atresmedia Televisión in collaboration with Boomerang TV, Presunto Culpable was created by Javier Holgado, Josep Cister Rubio and Aitor Montánchez. The writing team was formed by Javier Holgado, Carlos Vila and Susana López Rubio whereas the episodes were directed by Alejandro Bazzano, Alberto Ruiz Rojo and Menna Fité. The cinematography was tasked to Josu Inchaustegui and Pascal Gaigne composed the score.

Filming took place on location in the Basque Country. Conversely some scenes were shot in Paris, Madrid and Segovia. The 23-week-long shooting was wrapped up by April 2018.

The 13-episode series premiered on 18 September 2018 on Antena 3. The weekly broadcasting run ended on 11 December 2018, with the finale earning a 14.9% audience share.

Awards and nominations 

|-
| align = "center" rowspan  = "2" | 2018 || rowspan  = "2" | 6th  || colspan = "2" | Best Drama Series ||  || rowspan  = "2" | 
|-
| Best Drama Actor || Miguel Ángel Muñoz || 
|-
| align = "center" rowspan = "4" | 2019 || 25th Shanghai Television Festival || colspan = "2" | Best Foreign TV Series ||  || 
|-
| rowspan = "3" | 21st Iris Awards || colspan = "2" | Best Fiction ||  || rowspan = "3" | 
|-
| Best Direction || Alejandro Bazzano, Alberto Ruiz Rojo & Menna Fité || 
|-
| Best Actress || Elvira Mínguez ||  
|}

References 

Television shows filmed in Spain
Spanish mystery television series
Spanish thriller television series
2018 Spanish television series debuts
2018 Spanish television series endings
2010s Spanish drama television series
Antena 3 (Spanish TV channel) network series
Spanish-language television shows
Television shows set in the Basque Country (autonomous community)
Television series by Boomerang TV